

Events

February events 
 February 6 – The first railroad charter in the United States is issued to the New Jersey Railroad Company, a railroad that ultimately was never built.

May or June events 
 Bryn Oer Tramway in South Wales opened.

July events 
 July 31 – The boiler explosion of a locomotive designed by William Brunton on the Newbottle Waggonway in North East England kills around a dozen people, the first railway disaster.

Births

January births 
 January 21 - Daniel McCallum, Scottish-born General Superintendent of New York and Erie Railroad 1855–1858 (d. 1878).

March births 
 March 24 - Edward Entwistle, first driver of the Rocket locomotive (d. 1909).

Deaths

References